Dolores Catania (née Spagnola; born December 28, 1970) is an American television personality, philanthropist, and entrepreneur. She is best known as a main cast member of The Real Housewives of New Jersey, appearing in that capacity since the show's seventh season in 2016.

Early life
Catania was born in Paterson, New Jersey to Lawrence and Valerie Spagnola. Her father is a former Paterson Chief of Police and her mother is a homemaker. She has three sisters, Laura, Tonya, and Valerie "Val", and a brother, Louis. She is of Italian and Irish descent.

Catania and her siblings were raised in Paterson along with her fellow Real Housewives of New Jersey co-star Teresa Giudice and Giudice's cousin and former cast member Kathy Wakile.

In season 11 of The Real Housewives of New Jersey, Dolores revealed that her parents have remained happily married, despite living separately since her father became Paterson's Chief of Police.

Career
Prior to joining the Housewives, Dolores had been employed as a waitress, shampoo girl, corrections officer, realtor, and surgical assistant.  She actively owns a fitness franchise and flips houses with her ex-husband. She is a philanthropist, supporting many charitable causes (e.g., animal welfare and local relief efforts). She has also appeared in several independent projects, including Breaking Points and Around the Sun by Brad Forenza.

In 2009, Dolores was asked to join season 1 of The Real Housewives of New Jersey but opted instead for guest appearances as a "friend" of the inaugural wives and was subsequently replaced by Caroline Manzo. Outside of the show, she has maintained long-standing friendships with original cast members Teresa Giudice, Jacqueline Laurita, and Caroline Manzo. In 2016, Catania joined the main cast starting in season 7. Since joining the series her storylines have primarily focused on her romantic life, relationship with her ex, motherhood, self-discovery, loyalty, and independence and since joining has been ranked as one of the most relatable housewives and was voted "Miss Congeniality" across the entire Real Housewives syndicate by Bravo fans in 2018.

Personal life
Dolores married Frank Catania on September 16, 1994. The pair have two children, Gabrielle "Gaby" (born 1995) and Frank "Frankie" III (born 1998). During her first season as Housewife, Catania disclosed that Frank had been unfaithful while she was nine months pregnant with Frankie, effectively ending their marriage. 

In 2017, she started dating maternal-fetal medicine specialist David Principe. The two were introduced by Catania's friend and former co-star Siggy Flicker. The couple announced their split in December 2021.

References

1970 births
Living people
American television personalities
People from Paterson, New Jersey